Love Message (Mandarin: Aiqin duanxun) is a 2005 film directed by Ah Gan.

Cast
 Leo Ku
 Angela Chang

External links
 

2000s Mandarin-language films
2005 films
Chinese romantic drama films